The 2000 CONCACAF Gold Cup was the fifth edition of the Gold Cup, the soccer championship of North America, Central America and the Caribbean (CONCACAF), and the 15th overall CONCACAF tournament. It was held in Los Angeles, Miami, and San Diego in the United States. The format of the tournament changed from 1998; it was expanded to twelve teams, split into four groups of three. The top two teams in each group would advance to the quarter-finals. Peru and Colombia were invited from CONMEBOL, and the Republic of Korea were invited from AFC.

With all three games in Group D ending in ties and Canada tied with the Republic of Korea on every tiebreaker, a coin toss was used. Canada won and advanced to the quarter-finals. They went on to win their first and to date only Gold Cup title. In the quarter-finals, Canada upset defending champions Mexico in golden goal extra time 2–1. They defeated Trinidad and Tobago in the semi-finals 1–0 after Craig Forrest saved a first-half penalty. Already assured as CONCACAF champions, Canada topped invitees Colombia 2–0 in the final.

The tournament marks the only time a CONCACAF Gold Cup has been won by a country other than the United States or Mexico, and the only time in the tournament's history that neither the United States nor Mexico made the final.

Venues

Squads

The 12 national teams involved in the tournament were required to register a squad of 18 players; only players in these squads were eligible to take part in the tournament.

Qualified teams

Qualification play-off

A qualification competition was held in the United States in October 1999. The following four teams competed in the playoff:

, as the lowest ranking member of North American Football Union
, as third place team in the 1998 Caribbean Cup
, as runner-up in the 1999 Caribbean Cup
, as fourth place team in the 1999 UNCAF Nations Cup.

Group stage

Group A

Group B

Group C

Group D

Knockout stage

Quarter-finals

Match abandoned after 89' due to pitch invasion.

Semi-finals

Final

Statistics

Goalscorers
4 goals
 Carlo Corazzin

3 goals
 Carlos Pavón

2 goals

 Paulo Wanchope
 Roberto Palacios
 Arnold Dwarika
 Cobi Jones

1 goal

 Jason De Vos
 Richard Hastings
 Mark Watson
 Faustino Asprilla
 Gerardo Bedoya
 Víctor Bonilla
 Gonzalo Martínez
 Hernán Medford
 Jafet Soto
 Harold Wallace
 Erick Miranda
 Juan Carlos Plata
 Guillermo Ramírez
 Sébastien Vorbe
 Samuel Caballero
 Reynaldo Clavasquín
 Milton Núñez
 José Luis Pineda
 Luis Hernández
 Rafael Márquez
 Emilio Mora
 Francisco Palencia
 Ramón Ramírez
 José del Solar
 Roberto Holsen
 Waldir Sáenz
 Jorge Soto
 Ysrael Zúñiga
 Lee Dong-gook
 Lee Min-sung
 Russell Latapy
 David Nakhid
 Mickey Trotman
 Dwight Yorke
 Chris Armas
 Jovan Kirovski
 Brian McBride
 Eric Wynalda

Own goals

 Marcial Salazar for Colombia
 Shurland David for Mexico

Awards

Best XI
G -  Craig Forrest
D -  Rafael Márquez
D -  Jason DeVos
M -  Ramón Ramírez
M -  Roberto Palacios
M -  Russell Latapy
F -  Cobi Jones
F -  Arnold Dwarika
F -  Carlo Corazzin
F -  Carlos Pavón
F -  Dwight Yorke

Broadcasting

References

External links
Award Winners
Squads
toror66.com

 
Gold Cup
CONCACAF Gold Cup 2000
CONCACAF
CONCACAF Gold Cup
CONCACAF Gold Cup
CONCACAF Gold Cup tournaments
2000 in Colombian football
2000 in South Korean football
2000 in Peruvian football